Harunur Rashid may refer to:
 Harunur Rashid (cricketer)
 Harunur Rashid (filmmaker)
 Harunur Rashid (Chandpur politician)
 Harunur Rashid (Chapai Nawabganj politician)
 Harunur Rashid (Lakshmipur politician)

See also
 Haroon Rashid (disambiguation)